Filippo Messori (born 12 November 1973) is a former professional tennis player from Italy. He was born in Modena.

Messori enjoyed most of his tennis success while playing doubles. During his career, he won one doubles title, and achieved a career-high doubles ranking of world No. 63 in 1997.

As of 2018, Messori lives in the Netherlands with his wife and three sons. He is currently a tennis coach.

Career finals

Doubles: 3 (1 win, 2 losses)

External links
 
 

1973 births
Living people
Italian male tennis players
Sportspeople from Modena
20th-century Italian people